Abani Roy (10 March 1939 – 25 November 2021) was a member of the Rajya Sabha, the upper house of the Indian Parliament, where he represented West Bengal. He was the leader of the Revolutionary Socialist Party. He was General Secretary of United Trade Union Congress. He associated with the RSP since the age of 20 in 1959, Roy was the member of its Central Secretariat, besides being the general secretary of the party for a brief period. His first foray into electoral politics was in 1978, when he was elected to the Kolkata Corporation. He entered the Rajya Sabha in 1998 and retired in August 2011.

He died on 25 November 2021 at the age of 84 at Ram Manohar Lohia Hospital in Delhi.

References

External links
 Profile on Rajya Sabha website

1939 births
2021 deaths
Revolutionary Socialist Party (India) politicians
University of Calcutta alumni
Rajya Sabha members from West Bengal